The men's 4 x 800 metres relay at the 2017 IAAF World Relays was held at the Thomas Robinson Stadium on 23 April.

Records
Prior to the competition, the records were as follows:

Schedule

Results

Final

References

4 x 800 metres relay
4 × 800 metres relay